Australia was one of the founding members of the United Nations (UN) in 1945 and has been actively engaged in the organisation since its formation. The UN is seen by the Australian Government as a means to influence events which directly affect Australia's interests but over which they have little unilateral control.

Diplomatic representation

Australia has a permanent diplomatic mission to the UN in New York City along with missions in Geneva, Vienna and Nairobi. The Australian Mission is headed by an Ambassador and Permanent Representative and staffed by officers from the Department of Foreign Affairs, AusAid, the Australian Defence Force, the Australian Federal Police, as well as local employees.  The Mission provides the core of Australia's delegation to UN conferences and meetings in New York, including regular and special sessions of the United Nations General Assembly. It also participates in the ongoing work of the UN's other organisations, such as the Security Council and the Economic and Social Council, and follows the activities of the UN's specialised agencies and programs.

Australia is the twelfth largest financial contributor to the UN. Australia contributed more than US$87 million in the years 2004 to 2006, with a regular budget of US$22.9 million, peacekeeping costs of approximately US$60 million, and over US$4 million contribution to International Tribunals.

Australia has been an elected member of the United Nations Security Council on five occasions in the past. H. V. Evatt, a former Opposition Leader of Australia and prominent figure in the Australian Labor Party, was President of the United Nations General Assembly in 1948.

UN service

Australian involvement in UN peacekeeping operations

Australians were the first peacekeepers to serve under United Nations auspices when they sent military observers to Indonesia in 1947 during the independence struggle. About 65,000 Australian personnel have partaken in more than fifty peacekeeping operations, in about 25 different conflicts. Operations include military observation, monitoring cease-fires, clearing landmines, humanitarian aid and the repatriation of refugees.

Since 1947 Australians have joined peacekeeping operations in Cambodia, Korea, Namibia, Rwanda, and Somalia among others. All three services of the Australian Defence Force, as well as police officers and civilians, have been involved in peacekeeping activities.

The most significant recent involvement from Australian peacekeeping troops is in the newly formed country of East Timor. Australia initially offered between 1,000 and 1,300 infantry, three Royal Australian Navy ships (HMAS Manoora and HMAS Kanimbla already stationed nearby, and HMAS Tobruk) along with other support capabilities. Australia's involvement in East Timor is through UNMISET, the United Nations Mission of Support to East Timor, and UNOTIL, the United Nations Office in Timor Leste and UNMIT, the United Nations Integrated Mission in Timor-Leste.

Australia also has peacekeepers from the Australian Defence Force participating in the United Nations Mission in Sudan, to support the African Union's Mission in Darfur.

Seven Australians have commanded or led multinational peacekeeping operations. Nine Australian peacekeepers have died on UN missions.

Australia-UN relations in 2008
In March 2008, senior United Nations officials travelled to Canberra to meet Prime Minister Kevin Rudd, elected three months earlier. According to The Age, the aim was to "repair relations". Hilde Johnson, deputy director of UNICEF, stated that Rudd was showing "stronger support" for the United Nations and multilateralism than his predecessor John Howard had. During Howard's Prime Ministership, UN high commissioner for human rights Mary Robinson had criticised Australia's human rights record. Johnson stated that the new Australian government had "explicitly said there's going to be a change, that the government will engage strongly and pro-actively with the UN". For the Australian government, Bob McMullan said that his country's "relationship with the major multi-lateral organisations has deteriorated in a manner that is quite contrary to Australia's long-term interests and needs to be repaired".

Australian Contributions to UN Regular Budget as at 2016

See also

2006 East Timor crisis
International Force for East Timor (INTERFET)

References

External links
 James Cotton and David Lee (eds), Australia and the United Nations, Canberra: Department of Foreign Affairs and Trade and Sydney: Longueville Books, 2013.
Australia and the United Nations, Department of Foreign Affairs and Trade (Australia)
Australian Permanent Mission to the United Nations
United Nations Information Centre for Australia, New Zealand and the South Pacific
Australia and the United Nations , National Archives of Australia
Assessment of Member States’ advances to the Working Capital Fund for the biennium 2016–2017 and contributions to the United Nations regular budget for 2016, United Nations